In the context of United States constitutional interpretation, original meaning is the dominant form of the legal theory of originalism today. It was made popular by Supreme Court Justice Antonin Scalia and contends that the terms of the United States Constitution should be interpreted as meaning what they meant when they were ratified, which is to say, it asks the question: "What would a reasonable person living at the time of ratification have understood these words to mean?"

The theory stands in equal opposition to interpretivist theories such as original intent, and legal realist theories such as that of the living Constitution.

Theory
Original meaning is a formalist theory, and a logical extension of textualism. Textualists believe that a statute means whatever the plain meaning of its words is, as opposed to other potential meanings, such as what those who drafted the law or voted for it intended it to say. Formalists would point out that it is unnecessary for any member of the legislature to share the intentions of any other member of the legislature, or even to have a particular intent; what counts is their vote, just as if a voter enters a polling station while inebriated, and indicates a preference for the wrong candidate, their vote will count as a vote for the person they indicated on the ballot paper, not for the candidate for whom they intended to vote before they started drinking. Likewise, even if not a single member of the legislature has read and comprehended the effect of a given bill (a scenario some critics of the USA PATRIOT Act and Patient Protection and Affordable Care Act allege to have actually occurred during the enactment of these statutes), once it becomes law, it is a law no less or more valid than an identically worded law passed when every member of the legislature is of the same mind and understanding regarding its meaning and effect. This being the case, it is the text of the law which governs.

Practice
An originalist inquiry into the original meaning of the Constitution is able to cast a much broader net than an inquiry into the original intent.

Originalists of all stripes cite The Federalist Papers. It is fairly tenuous to suggest that this represents a good source for the original intent: after all, Alexander Hamilton, who wrote the majority of those essays, was absent for the greater part of the Philadelphia Convention, and John Jay did not attend it at all. However, James Madison, the principal framer of the Constitution also wrote a substantial amount of The Federalist Papers. Also, to suggest Hamilton and Jay's absence from the convention implies their ignorance as to the Constitution's original meaning is demeaning to those two men and inaccurate. The collected anti-Federalist papers, of course, will be no use at all to a person searching for the original intent of the framers. However, as evidence of how a reasonable person at the time would have understood the words of the Constitution, The Federalist Papers and the anti-Federalist essays are evidence of direct relevance.

Likewise, neither John Adams nor Thomas Jefferson attended the Convention, and thus two of the most prolific writers of the founding era are necessarily excluded (or, at best, abstracted) from an original-intent inquiry. Because they were reasonable contemporaries of the Framers, their writings are informative to discussions of the text's original meaning.

One of the primary virtues of original meaning over original intent is that the original meaning is a fairly discernible thing, while the original intent is nebulous and uncertain. This is well-illustrated by the use of dictionaries. Contemporaneous dictionaries are of dubious value to an original intent inquiry, but of high value to an original meaning inquiry: we can establish what the words the Framers chose meant, but that is not necessarily conclusive as to what they intended to say (consider for example, the law of unintended consequences).

Origins
The theory was arguably pioneered and popularized by Justice Antonin Scalia; whether Scalia could take credit for inventing it, he remained one of its most forceful and high-profile proponents, although he was also accused of deviating from the method (he himself admitted that "in a crunch I may prove a faint-hearted originalist").

See also
Judicial activism
Legal formalism
Originalism
Original intent
Textualism

References

Philosophy of law
Intention